"Hero" is a 2008 pop song performed by the Swedish singer Charlotte Perrelli, written by Fredrik Kempe and Bobby Ljunggren. It was entered into the Melodifestivalen 2008, winning at the Globen arena on 15 March 2008. Due to this, it represented  at the 2008 Eurovision Song Contest in Belgrade, Serbia.

The single "Hero" was released on 12 March 2008. It topped the Swedish Singles chart, and was certified Gold, in recognition of 10,000 copies sold. After the contest, it was certified Platinum, as 40,000 copies sold. The song entered the 3rd place at Svensktoppen on 13 April 2008, and it stayed on the chart for eight weeks until 1 June 2008 peaking at #3. The Swedish single top 100, she peaked at #1 for 5 weeks, and left the charts after 19 weeks. Her position in the 'best of all time' is #503 with 769 points.

Melodifestivalen and Eurovision

"Hero" participated in the fourth heat of the 2008 Melodifestivalen which was held on 1 March 2008 at the Telenor Arena in Karlskrona. The song was the last of the eight competing entries to perform and directly qualified to the contest final as one of the two songs song which received the most telephone votes. On 15 March, during the final held at the Globe Arena in Stockholm, Perrelli was the first of the ten competing acts to perform, and "Hero" won the contest with 224 points, receiving the highest number of votes from the regional juries and the second-highest number of votes from the viewing public.

During the month of April and part of May, Perrelli went on a promotional tour through Europe. She visited Germany, Belgium, Albania, Montenegro, Serbia and the Netherlands. The single was released to radio stations in those countries to which she competed in the semifinal. She originally planned to visit Russia as well, but she didn't receive a visa in time and her tour there was cancelled.

Perrelli made it through the semifinal on 22 May in Eurovision Song Contest 2008 as the jury wildcard and competed in the final. However, she only managed to finish 18th out of 25 entries with 47 points.

Music video 
The Music video was shot in Stockholm on 14 April 2008, and the filming went on for two days. Among other shooting spots some of the scenes were filmed in the room of Globen Arena. During the shoot Perrelli was assisted by a personal make-up artist and stylist, ten cameramen, and her sister, Kina Björk.

The music video was officially released on 7 May 2008.

Cover versions
At TV4's Så mycket bättre in 2018, the song was performed by Linnea Henriksson.

Track listing
"Hero"
"Hero" (instrumental version)

Chart positions

Year-end charts

Release history

References

External links
"Hero" at the Swedish singles chart
Official Video
Biography, Photo, Video

2008 singles
2008 songs
Eurovision songs of 2008
Eurovision songs of Sweden
Melodifestivalen songs of 2008
Songs written by Fredrik Kempe
Songs written by Bobby Ljunggren
Number-one singles in Sweden
Charlotte Perrelli songs
Universal Music Group singles